Luke Williams (born 1977) is a Scottish author, whose first novel The Echo Chamber won the 2011 Saltire Society's Scottish First Book of the Year award.

Life
Williams grew up in Fife and divides his time between London and Edinburgh. He studied history at  the University of Edinburgh and the University of St Andrews. He completed an MA in creative writing at the University of East Anglia, where he was taught by W. G. Sebald, who influenced him greatly; Williams contributing a chapter to Saturn's Moons: A W.G. Sebald Handbook.

References

External links
writers' hub - The Life of a Writer - Luke Williams & Natasha Soobramanien

Living people
1977 births
People from Fife
21st-century British novelists
Alumni of the University of Edinburgh
Alumni of the University of St Andrews
Alumni of the University of East Anglia
Scottish novelists